Christine Montalbetti is a French novelist, playwright and professor of literature at the University of Paris. In her writing, Montalbetti practices what Warren Motte calls "intrusive narration," or a narrative style that engages the reader directly in dialogue. Thus in one of her short stories, Montalbetti remarks to the reader, "you are the one person who many imagine flawlessly the particular trouble that the unlucky hero of this story experiences."

Christine Montalbetti has written nine works of fiction, many of which have been translated into English and published with Dalkey Archive Press. Her most recent book, Nothing But the Waves and Wind, was awarded the 2014 Franz-Hessel-Preis for the best work of contemporary fiction.

Works

Translated Works
Western, Dalkey Archive Press, 2009 (Western, P.O.L, 2005)
The Origin of Man, Dalkey Archive Press, 2012 (L'Origine de l'homme, P.O.L, 2002)
Nothing But the Waves and Wind, Dalkey Archive Press, 2017 (Plus rien que les vagues et le vent,  P.O.L, 2014)
American Journal, Dalkey Archive Press, 2018 (Journée américaine, P.O.L, 2009)

Other Works
Sa fable achevée, Simon sort dans la bruine [His fable concluded, Simon steps into the drizzle], P.O.L, 2011.
Expérience de la campagne [Experience of the countryside], P.O.L, 2005.
Nouvelles sur le sentiment amoureux [Stories about the feeling of love], P.O.L, 2007.
Petits Déjeuners avec quelques écrivains célebres [Breakfasts with a few famous writers] P.O.L, 2008.
Le Cas Jekyll [The Jekyll Case], P.O.L, 2010.
L'Évaporation de l'oncle [The Evaporation of Uncle], P.O.L, 2011.

References

21st-century French novelists
Living people
Academic staff of the University of Paris
Academic staff of Rennes 2 University
Writers from Le Havre
Year of birth missing (living people)